The Manchu people are a Tungusic people who originated in Manchuria (modern Northeast China and Outer Manchuria).

Manchu or Manchoo may also refer to:

 Manchu language, a Tungusic language spoken in Heilongjiang, China
 Manchu dynasty or Qing dynasty from 1644 to 1912
 Manchukuo or Manchu State, a puppet state of the Empire of Japan from 1932 to 1945
 9th Infantry Regiment (United States), earned the nickname "Manchu" during the Boxer Rebellion and the China Relief Expedition
 Ulmus pumila 'Manchu', a Siberian Elm cultivar
 Manchu (surname), a surname (includes a list)
 Philippe Bouchet, French science-fiction illustrator who uses "Manchu" as pen name.

See also
 Manchuria (disambiguation)
 Manchurian (disambiguation)
 Manchurians (disambiguation)
 Manshu (disambiguation)